Ministry is an American industrial metal band founded in Chicago, Illinois in 1981 by producer, singer, and instrumentalist Al Jourgensen. Originally a synth-pop outfit, Ministry evolved into one of the pioneers of industrial rock and industrial metal in the late 1980s. The band's lineup has changed frequently, leaving Jourgensen as the sole original member. Musicians who have contributed to the band's studio or live activities include vocalists Nivek Ogre, Chris Connelly, Gibby Haynes, Burton C. Bell and Jello Biafra, guitarists Mike Scaccia and Tommy Victor, guitarist Cesar Soto, bassists Paul Barker, Paul Raven, Jason Christopher, Tony Campos and Paul D'Amour, drummers Jimmy DeGrasso, Bill Rieflin, Martin Atkins, Rey Washam, Max Brody, Joey Jordison and Roy Mayorga, keyboardist John Bechdel, and rappers and producers DJ Swamp and Arabian Prince.

Ministry attained commercial success in the late 1980s and early 1990s with three of their studio albums: The Land of Rape and Honey (1988), The Mind Is a Terrible Thing to Taste (1989) and Psalm 69 (1992). The first two were certified gold while Psalm 69 was certified platinum by the RIAA. Psalm 69 was followed by Filth Pig (1996), which was a stylistic departure for the band, and earned Ministry its highest chart position on the Billboard 200 at number nineteen, although it was met with mixed reception by critics and marked the beginning of the band's commercial decline. The lackluster response to their next album, Dark Side of the Spoon (1999), resulted in Warner Bros. dropping Ministry from the label and the group entered an extended hiatus in early 2000s, when Jourgensen entered rehab after years of substance abuse.

Following Jourgensen's recovery, Ministry resurfaced in 2003 with Animositisomina, which turned out to be their last album with Paul Barker, who would leave the band the following year after nearly two decades as an official member. Ministry returned to the thrash/industrial style of Psalm 69 and released three albums critical of then-President of the United States, George W. Bush, dubbed the "Bush Trilogy": Houses of the Molé (2004), Rio Grande Blood (2006) and The Last Sucker (2007); these albums effectively revitalized the band's commercial viability. Although The Last Sucker was initially intended to be the band's final album, Ministry reformed in 2011 and released Relapse in the following year. On December 22, 2012, longtime guitar contributor Mike Scaccia died of a heart attack, and he was posthumously featured in the next Ministry album, From Beer to Eternity (2013), which was again supposed to be their last album, as Jourgensen thought his death was the end of the band. Despite this, Ministry has since released two more albums: AmeriKKKant (2018) and Moral Hygiene (2021), and they are working on new material for a sixteenth studio album as of October 2021.

The band has been nominated for six Grammy Awards and has performed at several music festivals, including the second annual Lollapalooza tour in 1992, co-headlining Big Day Out in 1995 and performing at Wacken Open Air thrice (in 2006, 2012 and 2016).

History

Formation and early days (1981–1982)
Ministry's origins date to 1978, when Jourgensen moved from Denver to Chicago to attend the University of Illinois at Chicago. He was introduced to the local underground scene by his then-girlfriend, and in 1979 he replaced Tom Hoffmann on guitars in Special Affect, a post-punk group which featured vocalist Frank Nardiello (Groovie Mann of My Life with the Thrill Kill Kult), drummer Harry Rushakoff (Concrete Blonde) and bassist Marty Sorenson. Following Special Affect's split in 1980, Jourgensen formed a short-lived band called the Silly Carmichaels, which featured members of the Imports and played two shows.

In 1981, Jourgensen met Jim Nash and Danny Flesher, co-founders and co-owners of the indie record label and shop Wax Trax! Records who recommended him as a touring guitarist for Divine. After playing a few concerts with the latter, Jourgensen began to write and record songs in his apartment, using a newly bought ARP Omni synthesizer, a drum machine, and a reel-to-reel tape recorder. He presented a demo to Jim Nash, who suggested Jourgensen record a single and form a touring band, which Jourgensen decided to call Ministry.

The first line-up of Ministry consisted of keyboardists Robert Roberts and John Davis, bassist Sorenson, and drummer Stephen George; Jourgensen auditioned several singers, all of whom were unsatisfactory, so he decided to perform vocals himself. Nash purchased recording sessions at Hedden West studios which resulted in a twelve-inch single featuring "I'm Falling" and instrumental track "Primental" on the A-side, with the song "Cold Life" on the B-side. The record was co-produced by Jay O'Roarke and Iain Burgess and released in late 1981 on Wax Trax! in the US. In March 1982, the single was licensed by British label Situation Two, with "Cold Life" as the A-side.

Ministry performed their debut concert on New Year's Eve 1982 in the Chicago club Misfits, and, in the spring, commenced a tour of the Northeast and the Midwest, supporting Medium Medium, A Flock of Seagulls, Culture Club, and Depeche Mode. Meanwhile, the "I'm Falling / Cold Life" single reached No. 45 in the Billboard Hot Dance/Disco chart with approximately 10,000 copies as of September 1982, and thus scoring Wax Trax!' first hit. The songwriter Aimee Mann briefly joined the group in the early 80s.

With Sympathy and later Wax Trax! singles (1983–1985) 

The band's initial success drew the attention of Arista Records founder and chief executive Clive Davis, who offered them a deal, promising to make them "the next Joy Division"—a promise that Jourgensen later considered to be misleading. Signing a six-figure, two-album deal, the band—with Jourgensen and George comprising the official line-up—moved to record at the Synchro Sound studios in Boston, with producers Vince Ely (former drummer of Psychedelic Furs) and Ian Taylor (former assistant of Roy Thomas Baker), as well as keyboardists Roberts and Davis as session musicians.

A 12-inch single containing the song "Same Old Madness" was recorded and planned for release, along with its accompanying music video. However, "Same Old Madness"—both the song and video—did not surface until 2014; instead, "Work for Love" was released in January 1983 and peaked No. 20 on the Hot Dance/Disco chart. Ministry's debut album, entitled With Sympathy (also known as Work for Love in Europe), was finished around this time and issued in May, reaching No. 94 in the Billboard 200. On release, the album was supported by two more singles—"Revenge" (with a music video partially reworked from "Same Old Madness") and "I Wanted to Tell Her" (a reworked version of "Primental"), and a supporting concert tour with the Police during the North American leg of their Synchronicity tour. During this time, Jourgensen met the members of Seattle-based band the Blackouts—namely bassist Paul Barker and drummer Bill Rieflin, as well their then-manager Patty Marsh, who later became Jourgensen's wife from 1984 to 1995.

In spite of With Sympathys success, Jourgensen's relations with Arista were acrimonious. Eventually, Jourgensen sent a demo tape featuring a cover version of Roxy Music's song "Same Old Scene" before parting ways with Arista, suing the latter for violating contractual obligations. Since then, Jourgensen has expressed dislike for the With Sympathy-era, often providing different (and widely conflicting) explanations for his antipathy. In a 2004 interview, conducted by Mark Prindle, Jourgensen said that after signing with Arista, all artistic control of Ministry was "handed over" to other writers and producers. In his 2013 autobiography, Jourgensen gave a different explanation, saying that he was pressured by Arista management into producing his existing songs in the then-popular synthpop style, as a means of making them more commercially palatable. However, in the 1980s, Jourgensen said that when he discovered hardcore music, his musical direction simply changed; Jourgensen reiterated this point in 2012, and again in 2018. In 2019, he stated that the record was "fine", only that it could have been a lot better without interference from the record company. In 2021, Jourgensen resurrected the story that Arista took full control of the production and songwriting process, made Jourgensen cut his hair and bought him a wardrobe of sharkskin suits, and this time added the label wanted Ministry to sound like Wham! (a band who were not successful in the US until 1984: one year after With Sympathy had been released). Jourgensen assumes a false English accent for all of the album's songs, for which he also later expressed great dislike, though Patty Marsh stated in a 2013 interview "...the English accent thing was more an homage to the bands he loved than anything else. He was not trying to come off as British. The Stones used a southern accent and no one crawled up their ass for it.", an explanation Jourgensen himself had also given in a prior, 1983 interview with Richard Skinner.

Departed from Arista, Jourgensen returned with Ministry on Wax Trax! in mid-1984. While working as a cashier in the Wax Trax! store, he continued to record new material. In Autumn 1984, Ministry embarked on a new tour with a renewed line-up, supported by Belgian industrial dance act Front 242. During this tour, Sire Records co-owner Seymour Stein attended several gigs, offering the band a new deal; Jourgensen, recalling his negative experience with Arista, repeatedly declined, but eventually agreed to sign on the condition that Sire would provide resources to support the Wax Trax! imprint; as Jourgensen put it, "it was kind of a personal sacrifice to keep that company rolling and allow them to keep signing bands." George left Ministry soon after this tour, disagreeing with Jourgensen over increased use of drum machines, and went on to form the short-lived band Colortone, and, much later, to pursue a record engineering career. Ministry released several singles throughout the Summer of 1985—"All Day", "(Every Day Is) Halloween" and "The Nature of Love", as well as a reissue of "Cold Life"—which were cited as marking Jourgensen's first attempt at injecting industrial elements into Ministry's sound. Initially the B-side on "All Day" single, "... Halloween" became viewed as a goth anthem similar to Bauhaus' "Bela Lugosi's Dead"; "The Nature of Love", which came out in June 1985, became Ministry's final single on Wax Trax!; in July 1985, the band was shown as signed to Sire Records.

Twitch (1985–1987)
Ministry debuted on Sire/Warner Bros. in late 1985 with the single "Over the Shoulder", preceding the release of the band's second studio album, Twitch, in March 1986. Twitch was recorded and mixed largely at Southern Studios in London and Hansa Tonstudio in West Berlin during 1985, with the On-U Sound Records owner Adrian Sherwood and Jourgensen sharing co-production duties. Despite the contribution of several others (namely Belgian singer Luc van Acker and Sherwood's acquaintance Keith LeBlanc), the album's material was mainly performed by Jourgensen, listed as the band's sole member. Some material, recorded during the Twitch sessions, was later used for LeBlanc's and Sherwood's other projects, most prominently LeBlanc's solo album Major Malfunction.

On release, Twitch hit No. 194 in Billboard 200, and was supported by a US and Canadian tour. Jourgensen assembled a new touring line-up, featuring Roland Barker on keyboards, Paul Barker on bass and Bill Rieflin on drums.; . Twitch received mixed reviews, with a music critic Robert Christgau stating, "Chicago's Anglodisco clones meet Anglodisco renegade Adrian Sherwood and promptly improve themselves by trading in wimpy on arty"; nevertheless, the album came to be viewed as a pivotal point in the band's discography, as it signaled ongoing changes in Ministry's sound. In later publications, Jourgensen credited Sherwood with giving his music an aggressive edge and providing production advice, but considered the record "so Adrian Sherwood-influenced."

Breakthrough success (1988–1993)
After Twitch, Paul Barker became Jourgensen's primary collaborator in Ministry; until his departure, he was the only person credited as a member of the band other than Jourgensen. Jourgensen then made another significant change to Ministry's sound when he resumed playing electric guitar. With Rieflin on drums, Ministry recorded The Land of Rape and Honey (1988). The album continued their success in the underground music scene. The Land of Rape and Honey made use of synthesizers, keyboards, tape loops, jackhammering drum machines, dialogue excerpted from movies, unconventional electronic processing, and, in parts, heavy distorted electric guitar and bass.

The album was supported by a tour in 1988 and the singles and music videos for "Stigmata" and "Flashback". "Stigmata" was also used in a key scene in Richard Stanley's 1990 film Hardware, although the band shown performing the song was Gwar.

The follow-up album, The Mind Is a Terrible Thing to Taste, was released in 1989. Due to the complex nature of the album's drumming, a second drummer, Martin Atkins (formerly of Public Image Ltd. and Killing Joke), was hired. In addition to Atkins, a ten piece touring line-up was formed, consisting of Chris Connelly (keyboards and vocals), Skinny Puppy vocalist Nivek Ogre (vocals and keyboards), Joe Kelly (vocals and backing vocals) and guitarists Mike Scaccia, Terry Roberts, and William Tucker, with Jourgensen, Paul Barker and Rieflin serving as the group's core members. This tour was documented on In Case You Didn't Feel Like Showing Up. Two opening tracks, "Burning Inside" and "Thieves", were released as a commercial single; "Burning Inside" was accompanied by a music video.

After completing the Revolting Cocks tour in early 1991, Jourgensen and his bandmates began work on a follow-up to The Mind ...  at Chicago Trax! studios, amidst problems brought on by growing substance abuse. During these initial sessions, Gibby Haynes of the Butthole Surfers recorded vocals for what became "Jesus Built My Hotrod", which hit No. 19 in the Modern Rock Tracks chart with approximately 128,000 copies as of mid-July 1992; considered Ministry's first and biggest commercial hit, it built significant anticipation for their upcoming album, then titled The Tapes of Wrath.  In an attempt to distance themselves from drugs and find fresh perspective, the band relocated from Chicago to Lake Geneva, Wisconsin, to record at Royal Recorders studios for ten weeks. After considering the Wisconsin sessions a "washout", they returned to Chicago to complete the album – now entitled Psalm 69: The Way to Succeed and the Way to Suck Eggs, after a chapter from Aleister Crowley's The Book of Lies – by early May 1992, with only nine of about thirty songs written being chosen to feature. The album was influenced by speed and thrash metal, often being described as their fastest record by fans and critics. It was released on July 14, 1992 and peaked at No. 27 on the Billboard 200 chart. Soon after, Ministry was invited to headline the second Lollapalooza tour with Pearl Jam, Red Hot Chili Peppers and Soundgarden, among others, before commencing a tour of Europe and the US, with Helmet and Sepultura as supporting acts.

Middle years, turmoil and Jourgensen's drug addiction (1994–2001)
In October 1994, Ministry performed at the eighth Bridge School Benefit charity concert, with sets of cover songs (most prominently Bob Dylan's "Lay Lady Lay") and one original song, "Paisley", which was intended to be on their next album. After constructing a studio in Austin, Texas in 1993, the band proceeded to record a new album in July 1994. After refusing to perform drums on a cover version of "Lay Lady Lay", Rieflin parted ways with Jourgensen midway through the recording process. Along with newly recruited Rey Washam (formerly of Scratch Acid, Didjits, and Rapeman) who performed the rest of the album's drum work, Ministry performed as one of the headliners for Australia and New Zealand's Big Day Out touring festival in January 1995. In spite of their growing success, Ministry was nearly derailed by drug problems and a series of arrests followed in August 1995. Completed at Chicago Trax Studios, Filth Pig was released in 1996. Musically, Filth Pig was more heavy metal than industrial, with synthesizers and samples mostly stripped from a mix that focused on conventional hard rock instrumentation.

The album's songs were played mostly at slower tempos than those on their previous three LPs, giving it an almost doom metal feel. Filth Pig was supported with the singles/videos "Reload", "The Fall", "Lay Lady Lay" and "Brick Windows" and with a tour in 1996 (the live performances were later anthologized on the Sphinctour album and DVD in 2002). Jourgensen has subsequently said that he was severely depressed during this period, that Filth Pig reflects this, and that he dislikes performing music from Filth Pig.

Ministry recorded their final studio album for Warner Bros. Records, Dark Side of the Spoon (1999), which they dedicated to William Tucker, who committed suicide earlier that year. For Dark Side of the Spoon, Ministry tried to diversify their sound by adding some melodic and synthetic touches to their usual electro-metal sound, along with some jazz influences, but the album was not well received, critically or commercially. However, the single "Bad Blood" appeared on the soundtrack album of The Matrix and was nominated for a 2000 Grammy award. During this period, Jourgensen had an infected toe amputated after accidentally stepping on a discarded hypodermic needle.

In the summer of 2000, Ministry was invited to that year's Ozzfest; amidst a management changeover, they were dropped from the bill and replaced by Soulfly.

After Ministry were dropped from Warner Bros. in 2000, the label issued the 2001 collection Greatest Fits, which featured a new song, "What About Us?". Ministry would later perform the song in a cameo appearance in the Steven Spielberg film AI: Artificial Intelligence. In 2000–2002, disputes with Warner Bros. Records resulted in the planned live albums Live Psalm 69, Sphinctour and ClittourUS on Ipecac Recordings being canceled. Sphinctour was released on Sanctuary Records.

Jourgensen's recovery from drug addiction and comeback (2001–2007)
Around 2001, Jourgensen almost lost his arm when he was bitten by a venomous spider. By his own admission, Jourgensen was suicidal during this period and decided to call an acquaintance he had met years earlier; the acquaintance, Angelina Luckacin, helped Jourgensen give up his massive substance habit, which included heroin and cocaine "speedballs", crack, LSD, various pharmaceuticals and as many as two full bottles of Bushmills whiskey per day (Luckacin and Jourgensen married soon after). Jourgensen and Barker, along with Max Brody who had joined as a saxophone player for the 1999 tour, focused on developing songs for a new record during 2001 and 2002, with the band issuing Animositisomina on Sanctuary Records in 2003. The sound was strongly heavy metal with voice effects, though it featured an almost-pop cover of Magazine's "The Light Pours Out Of Me". Animositisomina, compared to previous releases, sold poorly and singles for "Animosity" and "Piss" were canceled before they could be released.

Barker announced his departure from Ministry in January 2004. He stated that the trigger was his father dying while the band was wrapping up a summer tour in Europe, and also stated that his family life was his main focus at that particular time. Lukacin stated in 2013 that Jourgensen fell out with Barker over the band's finances. Jourgensen continued Ministry with Mike Scaccia and various other musicians.

For Ministry's next album, Jourgensen released the song "No W", a song critical of then-U.S. President George W. Bush; an alternate version of the track was placed on the multi-performer compilation Rock Against Bush, Vol. 1. The follow-up LP, Houses of the Molé (2004), contained the most explicitly political lyrics Jourgensen had yet written, with songs played more crudely than on previous recordings, giving the album the most metal-oriented sound of their career. In 2006, the band released Rio Grande Blood, an LP on Jourgensen's own 13th Planet Records. With Prong's Tommy Victor and Killing Joke's Paul Raven, the album featured an even heavier thrash metal sound drawing comparison to Slayer. The single "Lieslieslies" was nominated for the Grammy Award for Best Metal Performance at the 49th annual Grammy Awards. It, along with another song on the album, "The Great Satan", is also available as a downloadable content song for the 2008 video game Rock Band 2. In July 2007, the band released Rio Grande Dub, an album featuring remixes from the band's 2006 Rio Grande Blood album.

What Jourgensen expected to be Ministry's "final" album, The Last Sucker was released on September 18, 2007.

Paul Raven died on October 20, 2007, a month and two-days after the release of The Last Sucker, suffering an apparent heart attack shortly after arriving in Europe to commence recording for the French industrial band Treponem Pal near the Swiss border.

Breakup and posthumous releases (2008–2011)
Jourgensen remixed and co-produced Spyder Baby's "Bitter", which was released by Blind Prophecy Records in early 2008.

A song titled "Keys to the City", which became the theme song for the Chicago Blackhawks, was released on March 5, 2008. In addition to this single, two albums of covers/remixes, Cover Up (April 1, 2008) and Undercover (December 6, 2010) were released. All of these releases are credited to Ministry and Co-Conspirators''', since they feature collaborations between Jourgensen and other musicians.

Ministry's "farewell" tour, the "C-U-LaTour", started its North American leg on March 26, 2008 with Meshuggah performing as special guests and Hemlock as an opening act. They played their final North American shows in Chicago on May 10 and 12, 2008. The final date on the international leg of the tour was at the Tripod in Dublin, Ireland on July 18, 2008. During the performance, Jourgensen repeatedly reaffirmed it would indeed be the last Ministry show. Due to a large demand for tickets, an extra gig was added at the Tripod on July 19, 2008. The band again played to a full house. Ministry's final song at this show (and ostensibly their last live performance) was a rendition of their cover version of "What a Wonderful World".Adios ... Puta Madres, a live album featuring material culled from the tour, was released in 2009 on CD and DVD.

A documentary film called Fix: The Ministry Movie was planned for release sometime in 2010. However, the release date was pushed back to early 2011. Eventually, it premiered at the Chicago International Movies & Music Festival. Jourgensen sued the filmmaker, Doug Freel, for failing to fulfill a portion of the contract giving Jourgensen approval over the final cut, along with "thousands of dollars". The lawsuit was dropped in July 2011. On July 21, the film was screened privately at the Music Box Theater in Los Angeles.

Reunion, Relapse, death of Mike Scaccia and From Beer to Eternity (2011–2015)
On August 7, 2011, Ministry announced they would reform and would play at Germany's Wacken Open Air festival, set to take place on August 2–4, 2012. The reunion lineup featured Al Jourgensen on vocals, Mike Scaccia and Tommy Victor on guitar, Aaron Rossi on drums, John Bechdel on keyboards, and Tony Campos on bass.

Jourgensen told Metal Hammer in August 2011 that Ministry was working on a new album called Relapse, which they hoped to release by Christmas. Regarding the sound of the new material, he explained, "We've only got five songs to go. I've been listening to it the last couple of weeks and I wasn't really in the mood, I was just taking it as a joke. Just to pass the time at first but [Mikey's] raving about it. It's like, dude c'mon, this is not about Bush, so ... that part's over. The ulcers are gone and Bush is gone so it's time for something new. I think this is actually gonna wind up being the fastest and heaviest record I've ever done. Just because we did it as anti-therapy therapy against the country music we would just take days off and thrash faster than I've done in a long time, faster than Mikey's done in a long time. He just did a Rigor Mortis tour and said it was easy compared to this Ministry stuff so it's gonna be brutal and it's gonna freak a lot of people out."

Ministry announced on their website that they entered the studio on September 1, 2011 with engineer Sammy D'Ambruoso to begin recording their new album. During the third webisode featuring behind-the-scenes footage from the making of Relapse, a release date of March 23, 2012 was announced.

On December 23, 2011, Ministry released "99 Percenters", the first single from Relapse, and began streaming it on their Facebook page two days later. On February 24, 2012, Ministry released a second single, "Double Tap", which was included in the April 2012 issue of the Metal Hammer magazine. On March 23, 2012, Relapse was released; it was supported with "Defibrillatour", a concert tour which lasted from that year's June to August.

On December 23, 2012, guitarist Mike Scaccia died following an on-stage heart attack, while playing with his other band, Rigor Mortis. In an interview with Noisey in March 2013, Jourgensen announced that Ministry would break up again, explaining that he did not want to carry on without Scaccia. He explained, "Mikey was my best friend in the world and there's no Ministry without him. But I know the music we recorded together during the last weeks of his life had to be released to honor him. So after his funeral, I locked myself in my studio and turned the songs we had recorded into the best and last Ministry record anyone will ever hear. I can't do it without Mikey and I don't want to. So yes, this will be Ministry's last album." The album, titled From Beer to Eternity, was released on September 6, 2013. Jourgensen stated that Ministry would tour in support of From Beer to Eternity, but would not record any more albums.

AmeriKKKant, Moral Hygiene and upcoming sixteenth studio album (2016–present)

In an April 2016 interview with Loudwire, Jourgensen stated that Ministry would make a follow-up to From Beer to Eternity "if the circumstances are right." When asked in July about the possibility of a new album, Jourgensen stated, "When I was asked [before], it was after Mikey passed and the entire media immediately starts asking me what is going to happen to Ministry. He wasn't even buried yet. I thought, 'Fuck you.' I was really pissed and really angry. I said, 'Fuck Ministry and fuck you for asking.' They want to comment on Ministry when my best friend had died. It's been more than two years now, and I got more ideas and I have done albums with Mikey and have done them without him. It's time to get another record out. I have a bunch of songs written in my head. I wanted to have time to mourn before people start asking me about touring dates. It was sick. I was bombarded and email boxes were overloaded with 'what are you going to do now?' It was kind of creepy."

By February 2017, Ministry had begun working on their fourteenth studio album, titled AmeriKKKant. The album, released on March 9, 2018, includes guest appearances from Burton C. Bell of Fear Factory, former N.W.A member Arabian Prince, DJ Swamp and Lord of the Cello. During their performance at the Blackest of the Black Fest in Silverado, California in May 2017, Ministry debuted their first song in four years, "Antifa", which, at the time, was expected to appear on AmeriKKKant.

In an October 2018 interview with Billboard magazine, Jourgensen revealed that he had begun working on new material for Ministry's fifteenth studio album. He explained, "I have to get as many albums as I can done while Trump is still president, and then what am I going to do: write those crappy albums that I write while Democrats are president?" A month later, media reports noted that Jourgensen had reconnected with Barker after 15 years, hinting that the two might collaborate once again on the upcoming Ministry album.

In a 2019 interview with Revolver magazine, Jourgensen reaffirmed that he had been working on new material since 2018, and revealed that he had hired Paul D'Amour (formerly of Tool) as the new bassist of Ministry. The band – alongside Primus and Philip H. Anselmo & The Illegals – opened for Slayer on the final North American leg of their farewell tour, which took place in November 2019.

In December 2019, the band released a visual history coffee table book, Ministry: Prescripture, with author Aaron Tanner.

In January 2020, Ministry announced the "Industrial Strength Tour" would start in 2020, with drummer London May of Samhain, which would feature both KMFDM and Front Line Assembly as guests. The tour was to begin on 1 July and extend until August. In May 2020, the band announced that they postponed all dates on the Industrial Strength Tour until 2021, due to the COVID-19 pandemic. The 25–date tour, with KMFDM and Front Line Assembly, was scheduled to take place in March and April 2021; the trek was once again postponed to the fall of 2021, this time with Helmet replacing KMFDM, who were unable to partake in the tour because of restrictions caused by the COVID in their native Germany. On September 24, 2021, Ministry announced that The Industrial Strength tour had been postponed once more because of the pandemic, with the tour now scheduled to take place in March and April 2022, and the Melvins and Corrosion of Conformity replacing Front Line Assembly and Helmet as special guests.

On January 17, 2020, Billboard released an exposé on guitar player Sin Quirin, detailing accounts of Quirin's alleged behavior including sexual relationships with underage females while touring in San Antonio, TX, Portland, OR, and Tacoma, WA, in the early 2000s. In May 2021, Quirin announced via Facebook that he was leaving Ministry.

On March 24, 2020, longtime drummer Bill Rieflin died of cancer, which had been kept private. His death was announced the next day by Robert Fripp of King Crimson via Facebook.

On April 24, 2020, one month after Rieflin's passing, Ministry released their first song in two-and-a-half years, "Alert Level", which was expected to appear on the band's then-upcoming fifteenth studio album.

In May 2021, the band announced that drummer Roy Mayorga has rejoined the band.

On July 8, 2021, Ministry released "Good Trouble" as the first single from their fifteenth studio album Moral Hygiene, which was released on October 1.

About two weeks after the release of Moral Hygiene, Jourgensen revealed that another Ministry album "will be out in 6-8 months." In an interview with Metal Edge, Jourgensen said that the album will feature an arena rock-styled sound, and also hinted at one final Ministry album.

In early 2023, Ministry announced a tour with Gary Numan and Front Line Assembly, which is expected to last from April 20 to May 13, 2023.

Artistry

Ministry's experimentation, stylistic variation and changes during its career cross several genres of popular music. Alternative rock subgenres such as industrial rock and industrial metal are umbrella terms predominantly used to describe the band's career in general. Ministry has been classified under many other genres, including EBM/industrial dance, techno-rock, hard rock, heavy metal, speed metal, thrash metal, and electro-industrial; their early output has been categorised as new wave, synth-pop, dance-pop, electronic dance, and dark wave.  In the April 1989 issue of Spin Magazine, an author Michael Corcoran labelled the band as "industrial disco"; in 1994, writer Simon Glickman used this term as well. AllMusic's Steve Huey states that, previous to Nine Inch Nails' rise to mainstream popularity, "Ministry did more than any other band to popularize industrial dance music, injecting large doses of punky, over-the-top aggression and roaring heavy metal guitar riffs that helped their music find favor with metal and alternative audiences outside of industrial's cult fan base." Despite frequent descriptions of the band's music as industrial,; . Jourgensen disputed the use of this tag in several publications since the early 1990s, preferring instead to identify his style as "aggro", and, much later "industrious".

Despite Jourgensen's dislike of touring, Ministry are noted for their live performances, featuring extended versions of songs (as evidenced on In Case You Didn't Feel Like Showing Up) and disturbing visual imagery. MTV also recognized the band as an influential heavy metal act, highlighting the use of sampling during their heyday. Alternative Press included Ministry in their 1996 list of 100 underground inspirations of the past 20 years, stating that they merged "metal, samples, synths, and the 100-mph sound of urban paranoia, they pretty much created industrial music as we know it." Jourgensen revealed in 2008 that Ministry music is mostly on drop D and standard E tuning.

Related projects
Jourgensen, with former and current bandmates, has been active in a number of musical projects besides Ministry. Foremost of these was the Revolting Cocks, founded by Jourgensen, Richard 23 and Luc van Acker during Ministry and Front 242's tour in 1984. Since its formation, the band has released a number of records, and has gone through several line-up changes. 1000 Homo DJs, a project purposed for outtakes from The Land of Rape and Honey and The Mind ... , has recorded a cover of Black Sabbath's "Supernaut", featuring Nine Inch Nails frontman and one-time Revolting Cocks touring member Trent Reznor. PTP, a project led by Jourgensen and Barker, included the assistance from Nivek Ogre on one occasion, and Connelly on another, and notably provided the song "Show Me Your Spine" featured in Paul Verhoeven's 1987 film RoboCop. Other notable projects include Pailhead with Ian MacKaye of Minor Threat and Fugazi, Lard with former Dead Kennedys lead singer Jello Biafra, and Acid Horse with Cabaret Voltaire members Richard H. Kirk and Stephen Mallinder. Buck Satan and the 666 Shooters, a country project led by Jourgensen, released the sole album, Bikers Welcome Ladies Drink Free, in 2012 through 13th Planet Records. Surgical Meth Machine, a speed metal project originally tributed to guitarist Mike Scaccia

Barker has released several solo recordings under various monikers, including Age of Reason and Chicks & Speed: Futurism as Lead into Gold in 1990, The Perfect Pair as Flowering Blight in 2008, and Fix This!!!, an accompanying soundtrack of Fix: The Ministry Movie, under his own name in 2012. Through the 2000s, Barker formed Pink Anvil with Max Brody and U.S.S.A. with the Jesus Lizard guitarist Duane Denison.  Brody and Scaccia have also released materials as Goobersmoochers via Brody's Bandcamp site.

Members

Current members
 Al Jourgensen – lead vocals, guitars, keyboards, programming, harmonica, bandolin, production (1981–present)
 John Bechdel – keyboards (2006–2008, 2011–present)
 Cesar Soto – guitars, backing vocals (2015–present)
 Roy Mayorga – drums (2016–2017, 2021–present)
 Paul D'Amour – bass (2019–present)
 Monte Pittman – guitars (2014, 2021–present)

Former members

Keyboards
 John Davis – keyboards, backing vocals (1981–1982; died 2005)
 Robert Roberts – keyboards, backing vocals (1981–1983)
 Duane Buford – keyboards (1994–1999)
 DJ Swamp – turntables (2017–2018)

Drums
 Stephen George – drums (1981–1984)
 Bill Rieflin – drums, keyboards, guitar (1986–1994; died 2020)
 Rey Washam – drums (1994–1999, 2003)
 Max Brody – saxophone (1999–2004), drums & programming (2001-2004)
 Mark Baker – drums (2004–2005)
 Aaron Rossi – drums (2008, 2011–2016)
 Derek Abrams – drums (2017–2019)
 London May – drums (2020–2021)

Bass
 Martin Sorenson – bass (1981–1982)
 Brad Hallen – bass (1983–1984)
 Paul Barker – bass, keyboards, programming, production, vocals (1986–2003)
 John Monte – bass (2004)
 Paul Raven – bass, keyboards (2005–2007; died 2007)
 Tony Campos – bass, backing vocals (2008, 2011–2015, 2017–2019)
 Jason Christopher – bass, backing vocals (2016–2017)

Guitar
 Mike Scaccia – guitars (1989–1995, 2003–2006, 2011–2012; died 2012)
 Louis Svitek – guitars (1992–1999, 2003)
 Zlatko Hukic – guitars (1996–1999)
 Tommy Victor – guitars (2005–2008, 2011–2012)
 Sin Quirin – guitars, bass, keyboards (2007–2008, 2012–2021)

Additional/touring musicians

Keyboards
 Paul Taylor – keyboards (1981)
 Mark Pothier – keyboards, backing vocals (1983)
 Doug Chamberlin – keyboards, backing vocals (1983–1984)
 Patty Jourgensen – keyboards, backing vocals (1984)
 John Soroka – keyboards, backing vocals, percussion (1984)
 Roland Barker – keyboards (1986, 1992–1993), saxophone (1986)
 Sarolta DeFaltay – keyboards, backing vocals (1986)
 Marston Daley – keyboards (1987)
 Michael Balch – keyboards, programming (1991–1992)
 Darrell James – keyboards (2003–2004)

Guitar
 William Tucker – guitar (1989–1990; died 1999)
 Terry Roberts – guitar, backing vocals (1989–1990)
 Michel Bassin – guitar (1992)
 Sam Ladwig – guitar (1992)
 Rick Valles – guitar (2004)

Drums
 Jeff Ward – drums (1988; died 1993)
 Martin Atkins – drums (1989–1990)
 Tia Sprocket – drums (2003; died 2017)
 Joey Jordison – drums (2006; died 2021)
 Thomas Holtgreve – drums (2017)

Bass
 Casey Orr – bass (1992, 2012)
 Eddy Garcia – bass (2004)

Vocals
 Audrey Stanzler – vocals (1981–1982)
 Shay Jones – vocals (1982–1983)
 Yvonne Gage – vocals (1983–1984, 1999)
 Nivek Ogre – vocals (1988–1990)
 Chris Connelly – vocals (1989–1990, 1992–1993), keyboards (1989–1990)
 Joe Kelly – vocals (1989–1990)
 Marco Neves – vocals (1992)
 Burton C. Bell – vocals (2008, 2018)

Timeline

Discography

Studio albums
 With Sympathy (1983)
 Twitch (1986)
 The Land of Rape and Honey (1988)
 The Mind Is a Terrible Thing to Taste (1989)
 ΚΕΦΑΛΗΞΘ (1992)
 Filth Pig (1996)
 Dark Side of the Spoon (1999)
 Animositisomina (2003)
 Houses of the Molé (2004)
 Rio Grande Blood (2006)
 The Last Sucker (2007)
 Relapse (2012)
 From Beer to Eternity (2013)
 AmeriKKKant (2018)
 Moral Hygiene'' (2021)

Tours
 With Sympathy Tour, 1983
 Wax Trax! Singles Tour, 1984
 Twitch Tour, 1986–1987
 The Land of Rape and Honey Tour, 1988
 The Mind Tour, 1989–1990
 Lollapalooza 1992
 Psalm 69 Tour, 1992–1994
 Big Day Out, 1995
 Sphinctour, 1996
 ClitourUS, 1999
 Fornicatour, 2003
 Evil Doer Tour, 2004–2005
 MasterBaTour, 2006
 C-U-LaTour, 2008
 DeFiBriLaTouR / Relapse Tour, 2012
 From Beer to EternaTour, 2015
 Death Grips and Ministry US Tour 2017
 The AmeriKKKant Tour, 2018
 EU/UK Summer Tour, 2019
 Slayer's Final Campaign Tour with  Primus and  Phillip H. Anselmo & The Illegals, 2019
 Industrial Strength Tour, 2022 (initially scheduled to take place in summer 2020, later rescheduled to fall 2021 and then spring 2022 due to COVID-19)
 Moral Hygiene Tour, 2022
 Ministry, Gary Numan and Front Line Assembly Tour 2023

Notes

References

Bibliography

External links

 
 
 
 Ministry @ prongs.org

 
1981 establishments in Illinois
American industrial metal musical groups
American industrial music groups
Rock music groups from Illinois
Arista Records artists
Heavy metal musical groups from Illinois
Musical groups established in 1981
Musical groups disestablished in 2008
Musical groups reestablished in 2011
Musical groups from Chicago
Nuclear Blast artists
Political music groups
Sire Records artists
Situation Two artists
Warner Records artists
Wax Trax! Records artists